The 2022–23 Hong Kong FA Cup is the 48th edition of the Hong Kong FA Cup. 10 teams entered this edition. The competition is only open to clubs who participate in the 2022–23 Hong Kong Premier League, with lower division sides entering the Junior Division, a separate competition.

Since the previous edition of the FA Cup was cancelled due to COVID-19 pandemic in Hong Kong, Eastern, the champions of the 2019–20 Hong Kong FA Cup remain the defending champions of the competition.

Calendar

Bracket

Bold = winner
* = after extra time, = penalty shootout score

Fixtures and results

First round

Quarter-finals

Semi-finals

Final

Top scorers

References

2022-23
FA Cup
2022–23 domestic association football cups
Hong Kong
Hong Kong